This is the progression of world record improvements of the 110 metres hurdles M45 division of Masters athletics.

Key

References

Masters athletics world record progressions